The Islands' Sounder is a newspaper published in Eastsound in the U.S. state of Washington. It was founded as The Orcas Sounder in 1964 by Al and Nickee Magnuson. It was expanded from 15 issues per year to a weekly publishing schedule, and its name was changed to encompass the entire San Juan Islands archipelago.
The editor is Colleen Smith Armstrong.

When founded by Al and Nickee Magnuson in 1964, the Sounder was the first competition for the Friday Harbor Journal since the San Juan Islander's demise in 1914.

History
It was founded in 1964 by Al and Nickee Magnuson.
In 1974 it was renamed Islands' Sounder.
In 1985 it was sold to Ted and Kay Grossman and moved to a subscriber format.
It was bought by Sound Publishing, inc. in 1994.

References

Newspapers published in Washington (state)
San Juan County, Washington
San Juan Islands